De Gonia Springs is an unincorporated community in Skelton Township, Warrick County, in the U.S. state of Indiana.

History
A post office was established at De Gonia Springs in 1879, and remained in operation until 1926. The waters of the nearby spring were once believed to hold medicinal qualities.

Geography

References

Unincorporated communities in Warrick County, Indiana
Unincorporated communities in Indiana